Joseph Hun-wei Lee (Chinese: 李行偉; born October 20, 1952) is a Chinese civil engineer, currently serving as president of the Macau University of Science and Technology.

Education 
Lee received a bachelor of science, a master of science, and a doctor of philosophy in civil engineering from the Massachusetts Institute of Technology.

Biography 
Joseph Lee is currently president of the Macau University of Science and Technology from January 2021. He has been elected president of the International Association for Hydro-Environment Engineering and Research (IAHR), the first Chinese scholar to head the IAHR in its over eight decades of history.  He is a past President of the Hong Kong Academy of Engineering Sciences, past Chairman of Hong Kong Research Grant Council (RGC) as well as the Assessment Panel of the Hong Kong Public Policy Research Scheme.  He was the founding editor-in-chief of the Journal of Hydro-environment Research (JHER).

He joined the faculty of the University of Delaware as an assistant professor, and moved to the University of Hong Kong in 1980, where he became Redmond Chair Professor of Civil Engineering in 1995. At the University of Hong Kong, he was Dean of Engineering from 2000-2003, and Pro-Vice-Chancellor and Vice-President (Staffing) from 2004-2010.

During 2010-2016, he took office as vice president for research and graduate studies at Hong Kong University of Science and Technology, followed by appointments as Elman Family Professor of Engineering and Public Policy (2017-2018), and Senior Advisor to the President (2018-2020). He is also the Director of the Croucher Laboratory of Environmental Hydraulics since 2004.

Research 
Joseph Lee's research is about the use of hydraulics in application to environmental problems, specifically the theory of buoyant jets and its environmental applications, and the prediction and control of water quality. 

He developed the theoretical modelling and engineering prediction of the mixing and dilution of turbulent buoyant jets in an ambient current and proposed the Lagrangian integral jet model - JETLAG, a general tool that enables the first engineering prediction of the 3D trajectory and the initial dilution of an arbitrarily inclined buoyant jet in stratified ambient current.  The method forms the basis of the VISJET modelling system that is widely used internationally for impact assessment and outfall design. His work on buoyant jet theory has also been applied to unravel the transmission and spreading mechanisms of the Severe Acute Respiratory Syndrome (SARS) in Hong Kong in 2003.

Professor Lee has aided in developing early warning system of Harmful Algal Blooms (HAB) based on field observational systems, and physical-biological coupling using hydrodynamic and water quality modelling and also helped advance smart environmental management for water resilience in smart cities.  In 2008 he proposed Project WATERMAN – a real-time coastal water quality forecast and management system. The system has been adopted for environmental impact assessment and scientific management of marine fish culture by the Hong Kong Government.

He has served as consultant on hydro-environmental projects, contributing to the Hong Kong Harbour Area Treatment Scheme, Yuen Long Bypass Floodway and Tai Hang Tung Storage Scheme. His theory on supercritical vortex intakes has been adopted in the design of Hong Kong West Drainage Tunnel and urban drainage infrastructures in other mega-cities.

Honours and awards 
Joseph Lee has won Senior Research Fellowship Award of the Croucher Foundation (1998), the ASCE Hunter Rouse Hydraulic Engineering Award (2009), the China State Scientific and Technological Progress Award (2010, Second Class), the ASCE Emil Hilgard Hydraulic Prize (2013).  He was bestowed Honorary Membership by IAHR in 2015. Joseph Lee has also won the following:

 2002 Fellow, Hong Kong Academy of Engineering Sciences 
 2008 Fellow, Royal Academy of Engineering, United Kingdom 
 China State Scientific and Technological Progress Award (2010, Second Class) 
 ASCE Hunter Rouse Hydraulic Engineering Award (2009) 
 Honorary Membership, International Association for Hydro-environment Engineering and Research (IAHR) (2015) 
 Senior Research Fellowship Award of the Croucher Foundation (1998) 
 Croucher Laboratory of Environmental Hydraulics (2004) 
 Karl Emil Hilgard Hydraulic Prize of the American Society of Civil Engineers (ASCE) (2013) 
 Distinguished IAHR-APD Membership Award (2010) 
 Alexander von Humboldt Research Fellow, University of Karlsruhe, Germany (1992-1993) 
 Innovation Award (Sustainability), the Hong Kong Construction Industry Council (2017) 
 Innovation Award for Construction Industry of the Hong Kong Institution of Engineers (2002)  
 Da Yu Hydro-science and Engineering Award (Second class), China Hydraulic Engineering Society (2018)

References 

1952 births
Living people
Chinese engineers
Massachusetts Institute of Technology alumni